Bryn Dwyfor Williams (born 6 June 1977) is a chef originally from Denbigh, Wales. He is the head chef and sole proprietor of Odette's Restaurant, Primrose Hill, London. He shot to fame as merely a sous chef in 2006 by beating established and well-known chefs to cook the fish course for the Queen's 80th birthday celebrations on the television programme Great British Menu. He is now widely regarded as one of Wales' best chefs and one of Britain's new crop of "celebrity" chefs. In June 2015 he opened his new bistro, Bryn@Porth Eirias, on the sea shore in the north Wales town of Colwyn Bay. In 2018 he married Sharleen Spiteri, the frontwoman of Scottish band Texas, and the pair have become something of a celebrity couple in their own right. In 2021, they appeared on motoring podcast Fuelling Around to discuss their love of cars as well as their successful careers.

Biography
Bryn Dwyfor Williams was born and raised into a farming family near Denbigh, Wales, with his brothers Gareth and Siôn. His father Eifion, a mechanic, is one of seven children, four of whom became farmers. Gwenda, his mother, is a doctor's receptionist. He received all his education through the Welsh medium before moving on to college. He attended Ysgol Gynradd Twm o'r Nant, Denbigh (Primary) and Ysgol Uwchradd Glan Clwyd, St Asaph (Secondary). Williams lived in Denbigh until he was 18, then moved to London.

Early years
Williams's interest in food began as a young child during a primary school visit to a bakery in Denbigh. Seeing the individual ingredients turned into bread sparked an interest in food and its processes that would stay with him. He later worked at the same bakery as a teenager on Saturday mornings. He also developed a respect for food whilst growing vegetables, fishing and shooting for game on his uncle's farm as a youngster.

After leaving high school at the age of 16 he attended Coleg Llandrillo Cymru – studying catering. In 2009 Williams was appointed Skills Ambassador for the college.

After leaving college and working in Cafe Nicoise in Colwyn Bay, he was encouraged by head chef Carl Swift to take his skills to London. He was taken on by Marco Pierre White at the Criterion.

Professional career
After 3 years learning his craft under Marco Pierre White at the Criterion, he was sous chef under the tutelage of another culinary legend, Michel Roux Jr at Le Gavroche for a further three years. In 2001 he had an opportunity to experience European cuisine at first hand, working at the  Patisserie Millet in Paris, which is also where the Roux family honed their skills. In the same year, he went on to work at Hotel Negresco, a two Michelin-starred restaurant in Nice.

Back in Britain, Williams moved to the Michelin-starred Orrery Restaurant on Marylebone High Street in London, working there for four years under the tutelage of head chef André Garrett. Whilst working at the Orrery he competed for the Roux Scholarship, having been encouraged to participate by Garrett who was himself a previous winner of the prestigious award. Williams finished second overall that year.

Odette's
Following his success on the Great British Menu television series in 2006, Williams was offered the head chef's position at Odette's, a well-regarded neighbourhood restaurant in Primrose Hill, London since 1978. The restaurant had recently undergone an expensive refurbishment following its purchase by Vince Power, who was looking for the right name to head-up his latest culinary venture.

He bought out the owner and became sole chef-proprietor of Odette's on 1 October 2008. Reviews under Williams have been very good.

Bryn@Porth Eirias
It was announced on 9 September 2013 that Bryn Williams was to open a bistro at a multi-million pounds water sports centre on Colwyn Bay promenade. The announcement was made at the official opening of Porth Eirias by First Minister Carwyn Jones. The bistro opened in June 2015.

Bryn Williams at Somerset House
On 1 March 2018, he opened his third restaurant. The new restaurant and bar at Somerset House, London has fruit and vegetables taking centre stage.

Gorsedd Y Beirdd (Gorsedd of Bards)
Every year, people who have made a contribution to Welsh culture or society are chosen as new members for the Eisteddfod Druidic Order. Williams was honoured by the Gorsedd of the Bards at the National Eisteddfod of Wales 2013 festival in his home town of Denbigh.

Media

Television appearances
In 2006, he was a contestant on BBC Two's Great British Menu, impressing the judges throughout the stages of the competition. Williams interviewed his grandmother about dishes she used to eat as a child before settling on a menu. He beat Angela Hartnett in the regional round, and went on to win the public's vote to cook his fish course of 'Turbot with Oxtail' at Queen Elizabeth's 80th-birthday banquet at Mansion House. He retained his crown when he beat Matt Tebbutt in 2007. He has since become a familiar face on Saturday Kitchen, also making appearances on Something for the Weekend and Market Kitchen.

Williams's first language is Welsh, and he has appeared in several programmes on the Welsh-language television channel, S4C. He was one of three judges on the very popular Welsh-language cooking competition programme Chez / Casa Dudley; the third series started in Autumn 2008.

A six-part series of Cegin Bryn (Bryn's Kitchen) started on S4C in March 2012. The programme is based on his cookbook Bryn's Kitchen and features six key ingredients, cooked in 3 different ways whilst also tracking their journey from source to plate. The second series of Cegin Bryn quickly followed in January 2013.

Williams cooked live every day in the GMTV kitchen with Myleene Klass during the last week of its 17 years as a breakfast television broadcaster on ITV. GMTV came to an end on 3 September 2010.

Radio appearances
On 21 March 2010, Williams appeared on Wales on the Menu on BBC Radio Wales, where food critic Simon Wright challenged the Welsh public to attempt to get their dish on Bryn Williams' top London menu. Williams was impressed enough by 23-year-old student Tom Watts Jones and his complex dish of self-caught Welsh rabbit that he offered him a permanent job as a commis chef.

Cookbooks
Williams published his first book, Bryn's Kitchen, in March 2011. His second book, For The Love of Veg, was published in October 2013. His Welsh language cookbook, Tir a Môr, was published in October 2015.

Patronage
Williams is a Patron of Gwledd Conwy Feast, which is Wales' second-largest food festival with around 25,000 visitors each year.

Cardiff Blues, Wales and British and Irish Lions rugby player Martyn Williams appointed Bryn as one of the 7 Patrons of his Spirit of Wales testimonial year in 2010, to help raise money for vulnerable children and cancer victims. Other Patrons include Ian Woosnam, Ioan Gruffudd and James Dean Bradfield.

References

External links
Odette's Restaurant – Primrose Hill
BBC's North East guides – Hall of Fame, Bryn Williams 
Great British Menu – BBC Website 

1977 births
Living people
People from Denbigh
Welsh-language television presenters
Welsh chefs
British television chefs